Wilton is an unincorporated community in southern Granville County, North Carolina, United States, north of Grissom and is the former home of Wilton High School. It was declared no longer a city in 1985, when the state removed its post office charter.

National Register of Historic Places
Brassfield Baptist Church
Bobbitt-Rogers House and Tobacco Manufactory District
James W. Freeman House
Harris-Currin House
John Peace Jr. House

References

Unincorporated communities in Granville County, North Carolina
Unincorporated communities in North Carolina